Food Fighters was an action figure line released by Mattel in 1988. Proverbial for the concept of a food fight, the figures were all different types of anthropomorphic food dressed in military gear. Food Fighters consisted of ten figures, three vehicles, and an unproduced playset. The characters were divided into two armies: the protagonist Kitchen Commandos and the antagonist Refrigerator Rejects.

See also
Barnyard Commandos

References

External links
Food Fighters at The Virtual Toy Chest 
That New Toy Smell Episode On Food Fighter

1980s toys
Action figures
Fictional anthropomorphic characters
Fictional food characters
Fictional military organizations
Mattel
Fictional characters introduced in 1988